Allen Township is a township in Jewell County, Kansas, USA.  As of the 2000 census, its population was 43.

Geography 
Allen Township covers an area of 34.85 square miles (90.27 square kilometers); of this, 0.01 square miles (0.02 square kilometers) or 0.02 percent is water. The streams of Dry Creek and Little Cheyenne Creek run through this township .

Adjacent townships 
 Vicksburg Township (north)
 Beaver Township, Republic County (northeast)
 Grant Township, Cloud County (east)
 Lulu Township, Mitchell County (south)
 Plum Creek Township, Mitchell County (southwest)
 Prairie Township (west)

Cemeteries
The township contains two cemeteries: Lutheran and West Hope.

Major highways 
 K-28

References 
 U.S. Board on Geographic Names (GNIS)
 United States Census Bureau cartographic boundary files

External links 
 US-Counties.com
 City-Data.com

Townships in Jewell County, Kansas
Townships in Kansas